"Good Times Bad Times" is a song by Led Zeppelin.

Good Times Bad Times or GTBT may also refer to:

 Good Times, Bad Times... Ten Years of Godsmack, an album by Godsmack
 Good Times, Bad Times (TV series) (Goede Tijden, Slechte Tijden), a Dutch soap opera
 Gute Zeiten, schlechte Zeiten, a similar German soap opera
 Good Times, Bad Times (book), written by Harold Evans
 Good Times Bad Times (film), a 1969 Canadian TV film directed by Donald Shebib
 Good Times, Bad Times, an EP by Nuclear Assault
 Good Times/Bad Times, a novel by James Kirkwood, Jr.
 "Good Times, Bad Times", a song by The Rolling Stones from 12 X 5
 GTBT (album), album by Japanese band Chicago Poodle